St. Hallvard is a quarterly Norwegian language periodical issued by Selskabet for Oslo Byes Vel. It was established in 1915, with Edvard Bull and Anton Wilhelm Brøgger as editor in chiefs. The current editor is Jan Sigurd Østberg. The name is derived from the saint Hallvard Vebjørnsson.

References

External links
 
WorldCat record

1915 establishments in Norway
Magazines established in 1915
Magazines published in Oslo
Norwegian-language magazines
Quarterly magazines published in Norway